Digitaria stenotaphrodes is a species of flowering plant in the family Poaceae, native to Pacific islands (the Gilbert Islands, the Howland and Baker Islands, the Phoenix Islands, Tokelau and Manihiki, Tuvalu, the Line Islands, the Society Islands, the Tuamotus, and the Caroline Islands). The species was first described in 1853, as Panicum stenotaphrodes, by Christian Nees von Esenbeck. It was transferred to Digitaria in 1906 by Otto Stapf.

References

stenotaphrodes
Grasses of Oceania
Flora of the Gilbert Islands
Flora of the Howland and Baker Islands
Flora of the Phoenix Islands
Flora of Tokelau and Manihiki
Flora of Tuvalu
Flora of the Line Islands
Flora of the Society Islands
Flora of the Tuamotus
Flora of the Caroline Islands
Plants described in 1853
Flora without expected TNC conservation status